Peter Bentley may refer to:

 Peter Bentley (businessman) (1930–2021), Canadian businessman and chancellor of the University of Northern British Columbia
 Peter J. Bentley (born 1972), British author and computer scientist
Peter Bentley Sr. (1805–1875), mayor of Jersey City, New Jersey

See also 
 Peter Bently (born 1960), British children's writer